The Michel Bergeron Trophy is awarded annually to the Quebec Major Junior Hockey League's "Offensive Rookie of the Year." From 1969 to 1980, the trophy was awarded to the QMHL's "Overall Rookie of the Year." The Bergeron trophy's counterpart since 1980, is the Raymond Lagacé Trophy, awarded to the "Defensive Rookie of the Year." The QMHL created the RDS Cup in 1991, as a reunified Rookie of the Year award.

Offensive winners

Overall winners

External links
 QMJHL official site List of trophy winners.

Quebec Major Junior Hockey League trophies and awards